Loch Culag also known as Loch na Doire Daraich is a small freshwater shallow loch, located south of Lochinver in the Assynt district of Sutherland, Highland, Scotland. The loch is located in an area along with neighbouring Coigach, as the Assynt-Coigach National Scenic Area, one of 40 such areas in Scotland.

Geography
The primary inflow to the loch comes from Loch Druim Suardalain, located three-quarters of a mile to the east, via the short Culag River (Gealic:Amhainn na Culeig), and flows out of Loch Culag and meets the sea in the harbour of Lochinver, a short distance later.

The loch is surrounded by low-hills to the east and flat hillocks in all other directions. The very top of the mountain Suilven, known as Caisteal Liath ("Grey Castle") at 731m is visible in a north-east direction. At the northern-west end of the loch is a small promontory or peninsula that hosts Lochinver primary school.

References

Freshwater lochs of Scotland
Inver catchment
Birdwatching sites in Scotland